Rafael Pereira da Silva (born 13 March 1980) is a Brazilian right back who currently play for Miami Dade FC.

Playing career 
In July 2004 he was signed by Serie A team Messina.

He signed a two-year contract with Fluminense in January 2007. On 26 May 2009 Goiás have signed the unattached right-back until the end of season.

In January 2010 he was signed by Bahia but released in June.

He was linked to America (RJ) on 24 February 2011 but the deal never turned official. In March 2011 he left for CFZ do Rio.

On 1 May 2018, he signed with Miami Dade FC.

Coaching career 

In October 2016 Rafael starting coaching youth soccer as a volunteer give back to his local community. Rafael currently coaches and plays for Miami Dade FC in Florida.

Honours
Campeonato Carioca: 2004
Brazilian Cup: 2007

References

External links
 Futpedia 
 Guardian Stats Centre
 

1980 births
Living people
People from Ilha Solteira
Brazilian footballers
Serie A players
Guarani FC players
CR Vasco da Gama players
São Paulo FC players
Associação Desportiva São Caetano players
CR Flamengo footballers
A.C.R. Messina players
Fluminense FC players
Goiás Esporte Clube players
Esporte Clube Bahia players
Centro de Futebol Zico players
Miami Dade FC players
Association football fullbacks
Brazilian expatriate footballers
Expatriate footballers in Italy
Expatriate soccer players in the United States
Brazilian expatriate sportspeople in Italy
Footballers from São Paulo (state)